Boldva is a village in Borsod-Abaúj-Zemplén county, Hungary.

History 
The village got its name from the river Bódva.  The vicinity had been a settled place since ancient times in the Neolithic, Bronze Age and Iron Age. Written documents mention the village from the 13th century as Boldua.

Between 1175 and 1180 the Ordo Saint Benedict built a monastery at Boldva. The monastery church was erected to Saint John the Baptist. At the same time a rotunda was used by the village people. The ruins of this rotunda were excavated in the 1980s, during the renovation of the Árpád age church.

A famous codex, the so-called Pray codex, The Sacramentarium Bolvense contains one of the oldest Hungarian text: The Speech at the Funeral. During the second Mongolian invasion at 1285 the building was destroyed and burned. The monks escaped to the Somogyvár Abbey. Later, during the Turkish Wars, the church was renewed and reformed.

Sightseeings
 The reformed church and the ruins of the monastery, built in the 12th century. It had been built in romanesque style, in basilica form with 3 naves and 2 towers at the eastern side of the building. 
 Castle building of the Szathmáry family, from the 19th century.

Neighbour villages
Sajóecseg (5 km), Sajósenye (6 km), Ziliz (3 km), and the town of Edelény and Sajószentpéter also ca. 10 km.

References

 Valter Ilona: Boldva, református templom. (Boldva reformed Church). (TKM) Bp., 1991
 Töltéssy Zoltán (Szerk.) (Ed.) Boldva történeti kronológiája. – (Historical Chronology of Boldva). Boldva, 2000. 16 p.
 Gerevich Tibor: Magyarország románkori emlékei. (Die romanische Denkmäler Ungarns.) Egyetemi nyomda. Budapest, 1938. 843 p. --- 32-33. p., LXXXVI. tábla bal alsó kép.
 Gervers-Molnár Vera: A középkori Magyarország rotundái. (Romanesque Round Churches of Medieval Hungary.) (Mûvészettörténeti Füzetek, 4.) Akadémiai Kiadó. Budapest, 1972.
 Gerő, L. (1984): Magyar műemléki ABC. (Hungarian Architectural Heritage ABC.) Budapest
 Henszlmann, I. (1876): Magyarország ó-keresztyén, román és átmeneti stylü mű-emlékeinek rövid ismertetése, (Old-Christian, Romanesque and Transitional Style Architecture in Hungary). Királyi Magyar Egyetemi Nyomda, Budapest
Unknown (?): Phat a$$

External links 
 Boldva village homepage
 The building of the Boldva Benedict Abbey
 Aerial views of Boldva
 Street map 

Populated places in Borsod-Abaúj-Zemplén County
Romanesque architecture in Hungary